SkyTaxi Sp. z o.o. is a Polish charter airline headquartered in Wrocław and based at Copernicus Airport Wrocław.

Operations
It operates cargo charter flights world wide. SkyTaxi also operated passenger flights, i.e. scheduled regional services within France using the brand IGavion. Presently (2019-2021) SkyTaxi is supporting DHL with operations in Europe and Middle East, having aicrafts randomly based in Leipzig (LEJ) and Bahrain (BAH). Latest delivery of another B767-200 in October 2021 remains in DHL livery and is aimed to support various operations.

Fleet

Current fleet
The SkyTaxi fleet comprises the following cargo aircraft (as of October 2021):

Historic aircraft
The airline fleet previously included the following aircraft (as of 27 October 2013):
1 PZL M-20 Mewa
2 SAAB 340 one of which in quick change configuration.

References

External links
SkyTaxi
IGavion

2000 establishments in Poland
Airlines established in 2000
Airlines of Poland
Companies based in Wrocław